In music, a minor seventh chord is a seventh chord composed of a root note, together with a minor third, a perfect fifth, and a minor seventh (1, 3, 5, 7).
For example, the minor seventh chord built on C, commonly written as C–7, has pitches C–E–G–B:

Minor/minor seventh chord 
A seventh chord with a minor third, perfect fifth, and minor seventh is commonly called a minor seventh chord, but also sometimes a minor/minor seventh chord to distinguish it from the minor/major seventh chord discussed below.   It can be represented as either as m7 or −7, or in integer notation, {0, 3, 7, 10}.

This chord occurs on different scale degrees in different diatonic scales:

 In a major scale, it is on the supertonic, mediant, and submediant degrees (and ). This is why the ii in a ii–V–I turnaround is a minor seventh chord (ii7).

 In a natural minor scale, it is on the tonic, subdominant, and dominant degrees (and ).
 In a harmonic minor scale, it is only on the subdominant degree. 
 In an ascending melodic minor scale, it is only on the supertonic degree.

Example of tonic minor seventh chords include LaBelle's "Lady Marmalade", Roberta Flack's "Killing Me Softly with His Song", The Doobie Brothers' "Long Train Runnin'", Chic's "Le Freak", Lipps Inc.'s "Funkytown", and the Eagles' "One Of These Nights".

Minor/major seventh chord 
When the seventh note is a major seventh above the root, it is called a minor/major seventh chord. For example, the minor/major seventh chord built on C, commonly written as CmM7, has pitches C–E–G–B:

Its harmonic function is similar to that of a "normal" minor seventh, as is the minor seven flat five or half-diminished chord – but in each case, the altered tone (seventh or fifth, respectively) creates a different feeling which is exploited in modulations and to use leading-tones.

Minor seventh as virtual augmented sixth chord

The minor seventh chord may also have its interval of minor seventh (between root and seventh degree, i.e.: C–B in C–E–G–B) rewritten as an augmented sixth C–E–G–A. Rearranging and transposing, this gives A–C–E–F, a virtual minor version of the German augmented sixth chord.  Again like the typical augmented sixth, this enharmonic interpretation gives on a resolution irregular for the minor seventh but normal for the augmented sixth chord, where the 2 voices at the enharmonic major second converge to unison or diverge to octave.

Minor seventh chord table
{| class="wikitable"
!Chord
!Root
!Minor third
!Perfect fifth
!Minor seventh
|-
!Cm7
|C
|E
|G
|B
|-
!Cm7
|C
|E
|G
|B
|-
!Dm7
|D
|F (E)
|A
|C (B)
|-
!Dm7
|D
|F
|A
|C
|-
!Dm7
|D
|F
|A
|C
|-
!Em7
|E
|G
|B
|D
|-
!Em7
|E
|G
|B
|D
|-
!Fm7
|F
|A
|C
|E
|-
!Fm7
|F
|A
|C
|E
|-
!Gm7
|G
|B (A)
|D
|F (E)
|-
!Gm7
|G
|B
|D
|F
|-
!Gm7
|G
|B
|D
|F
|-
!Am7
|A
|C (B)
|E
|G
|-
!Am7
|A
|C
|E
|G
|-
!Am7
|A
|C
|E (F)
|G
|-
!Bm7
|B
|D
|F
|A
|-
!Bm7
|B
|D
|F
|A
|}

The just minor seventh chord is tuned in the ratios 10:12:15:18.  This may be found on iii, vi, and vii. Another tuning may be in the ratios 48:40:32:27.

Minor seventh chords for guitar

In standard tuning, the left is the low E string, the number is the fret, and x means mute the string.

 Am7: x02010 
 Bm7: xx7777
 Cm7: xx1313 
 Dm7: xx0211 
 Em7: xx0987 
 Fm7: xx1111
 Gm7: xx3333

References

Seventh chords

ca:Acord de sèptima#Acord de sèptima menor